Girl No. 217 (translit. Chelovek No. 217) is a 1945 Soviet drama film directed by Mikhail Romm. It was entered into the 1946 Cannes Film Festival.

An anti-Nazi film, it depicted a Russian girl enslaved to an inhuman German family.  She is even robbed of her name and forced to answer to "No. 217".  Subplots depict abuse directed at other POWs.  This reflected the use by Nazis of OST-Arbeiter as slave labour, including as family servants.

Cast
 Yelena Kuzmina as Tanya Krylova (Nr. 217)
 Vladimir Balashov as Max Krauss
 Tatyana Barysheva as Greta Krauss
 Heinrich Greif as Kurt Kahger
 Anastasiya Lissianskaya as Klava Vasilyeva
 Grigory Mikhaylov as prisoner Nr. 225
 Lidiya Sukharevskaya as Lotta Krauss
 Peter Suthanov as Rudolph Peschke
 Vasili Zajchikov as scientist

References

External links

1945 films
1945 drama films
Soviet drama films
Soviet black-and-white films
Films directed by Mikhail Romm
Films scored by Aram Khachaturian
Mosfilm films
Soviet World War II films